The 2014–15 Iowa Hawkeyes men's basketball team represented the University of Iowa in the 2014–15 NCAA Division I men's basketball season. The team was led by fifth-year head coach Fran McCaffery and played their home games at Carver-Hawkeye Arena. They were members of the Big Ten Conference. They finished the season 22–12, 12–6 in Big Ten play to finish in a three-way tie for third place. They lost in the second round of the Big Ten tournament to Penn State. They received an at-large bid to the NCAA tournament where they defeated Davidson in the second round before losing in the third round to Gonzaga.

Last season
The team finished the previous season with a record of 20-13, 9-9 in Big Ten play and finished 6th in the Big Ten. They lost in the first round in the 2014 Big Ten Conference men's basketball tournament to Northwestern. They received an at-large bid and lost in the NCAA First Four to Tennessee.

Departures

Incoming transfers

Roster

2014 commitments

Schedule and results

|-
!colspan=9 style="background:#000000; color:white;"| Exhibition

|-
!colspan=9 style="background:#000000; color:white;"| Non-conference regular season

|-
!colspan=9 style="background:#000000; color:white;"| Big Ten regular season

|-
!colspan=9 style="background:#000000; color:white;"| Big Ten tournament

|-
!colspan=9 style="background:#000000; color:white;"| NCAA tournament

Source: Schedule

Rankings

See also
2014–15 Iowa Hawkeyes women's basketball team

References

Iowa
Iowa Hawkeyes men's basketball seasons
Iowa
Hawk
Hawk